

2007 NZIHL Standings

PRW = Preliminary Round Win = 2 points
PRL = Preliminary Round Loss
W = Main Round Win = 4 points
L = Main Round Loss
T = Main Round Tie = 2 points

 NB - Canterbury Red Devils qualify top over the Botany Swarm after recording a win and tie in the 2 regular season games played between the 2 teams.

2007 Season Results

Preliminary Rounds

Round 1	

Dunedin

May 25, 2007 - Southern Stampede 2 v Canterbury Red Devils 9

May 26, 2007 - Southern Stampede 4 v Canterbury Red Devils 3

Avondale

May 26, 2007 - West Auckland Admirals 4 v Botany Swarm	6		

May 27, 2007 - West Auckland Admirals 3 v Botany Swarm	7		

Round 2

Christchurch

June 9, 2007 - Canterbury Red Devils 10 v Southern Stampede 5		

June 10, 2007 -	Canterbury Red Devils  2 v Southern Stampede 6	

Botany Downs

June 9, 2007 - Botany Swarm 3 v West Auckland Admirals	2		

June 10, 2007 -	Botany Swarm 2 v West Auckland Admirals	1		

Main Rounds

Round 3	 - Queenstown					

June 29, 2007 -	Southern Stampede 2 v Botany Swarm 3	

June 30, 2007 -	Southern Stampede 2 v Canterbury Red Devils 8		

July 1, 2007 - Canterbury Red Devils 3 v Botany Swarm 3		

Round 4 - Botany Downs

July 13, 2007 -	West Auckland Admirals	4 v Canterbury Red Devils 8		

July 14, 2007 -	Botany Swarm 4 v Canterbury Red Devils 6		

July 15, 2007 -	Botany Swarm 5 v West Auckland Admirals	4		

Round 5 - Christchurch

July 27, 2007 -	Southern Stampde 10 v West Auckland Admirals 2	

July 28, 2007 -	Canterbury Red Devils 7 v Southern Stampede 4	

July 29, 2007 -	Canterbury Red Devils 7 v West Auckland Admirals 3		

Round 6 - Avondale

August 10, 2007 - Botany Swarm 5 v Southern Stampede 1		

August 11, 2007	- West Auckland Admirals 4 v Southern Stampede 6		

August 12, 2007 - West Auckland Admirals 2 v Botany Swarm 6		
					
Final - Christchurch

September 8, 2007 - Canterbury Red Devils 0 v Botany Swarm 7

2007 Leading Scorers

2007 NZIHL Awards
MVP of Canterbury Red Devils - Janos Kaszala

MVP of Botany Swarm - Ian Wannamaker

MVP of Southern Stampede - Brett Speirs

MVP of West Auckland Admirals - Rick Parry

Best Defenceman - Hayden Argyle - Canterbury Red Devils

Top Goaltender - Zak Nothling - Botany Swarm

Top Points Scorer - Janos Kaszala - Canterbury Red Devils

League MVP - Janos Kaszala - Canterbury Red Devils

Top Rookie - Dale Harrop - Canterbury Red Devils

Finals MVP -  Charlie Huber - Botany Swarm

New Zealand Ice Hockey League seasons
New Zealand
Ice
New